Shaowu is a county-level city in northwestern Fujian province, People's Republic of China, located in the central part of the Wuyi Mountains and bordering Jiangxi province to the west. It has more than 100,000 inhabitants. The local dialect combines elements from Northern Min and Gan Chinese.

Administration

Subdistricts 
Zhaoyang

Tongtai

Shuibei

Shaikou

Towns 
Chengjiao

Shuibei

Xiasha

Weimin

Heping

Nakou

Hongdun

Dabugang

Yanshan

Xiaojiafang

Dazhu

Wujiatang

Townships 
Guilin

Zhangcuo

Jinkeng

Climate 
Shaowu has a monsoon-influenced humid subtropical climate (Köppen Cfa), with short, mild winters and very hot, humid summers. There is a marked decline in rainfall in autumn and early winter, and rainfall is both frequent and heavy during spring and early summer.

Transportation

Expressway 
 G70 Fuzhou-Yinchuan Expressway 
 S0311 Pucheng-Jianning Expressway  
 S0312 Shaowu-Guangze Expressway

National Highway 
 G316

County-level roads 
These are designated ""
 X804
 X805
 X829

Tourist Attractions 
 Mount Yunling: located in Longdou Village, Shuibei Town
 Wuyi Hot Springs: located in Shaikou Subdistrict
 China Maze Town: located in Weimin Town, the biggest botanical labyrinth in Fujian

Culture 
 Zhuandiao
 Shaowu Huagudeng
 Shaowu Puppetry
 Dabugang Nanci
 Nanci Beidiao
 the making of Nuo-Dance Masks
 Jostling-for-Wine Festival: originated from Hefang Village, Hongdun Town

Specialty 
 Shaowu baoci
 Youjiang tofu

Notable people 
 Tsui Po-ko
 Wu Meijin
 He Jiting

See also
 Sanji, a village in Chengjiao, Shaowu

References

External links

Cities in Fujian
Nanping